Nunukan International Airport  is an international airport serving Nunukan, located in the province of North Kalimantan in Indonesia.

Airlines and Destinations

Facilities
The airport has one runway designated 13/31 which measures .

References

External links
 

Airports in North Kalimantan